"Counting 5-4-3-2-1" is a song by American post-hardcore band Thursday, the first single from their fourth album, A City by the Light Divided. "Counting 1-2-3-4-5" was released to radio on April 11, 2006.

The song was originally written during the Full Collapse-era, but was re-arranged in a new key and was deemed suitable to be recorded.

Keyboardist Andrew Everding commented on the song's meaning and corresponding music video: "[Counting 5-4-3-2-1] specifically comes from not being happy in the town that you grew up in and wanting to get out as quickly as possible.  When we do videos, we send out a call and receive treatments and that one was one of the first ones that we got from Artificial Army.  We were originally going to do two videos…a low-budget animated video and then we were going to do another video to connect it, but then we started seeing what the animation was about. We usually go back and forth with ideas.  But for the most part, we trust the director. It was our first storyline video but there are some performance elements to it."

Personnel
Geoff Rickly - vocals
Tom Keeley - lead guitar, vocals
Steve Pedulla - rhythm guitar, vocals
Tim Payne - bass guitar
Tucker Rule - drums
Andrew Everding - keyboards, synthesizers

References

2006 singles
Thursday (band) songs
2006 songs
Island Records singles